Thompson Michael Dietz (born 1979) is a judge of the United States Court of Federal Claims.

Education 

Dietz earned his Bachelor of Arts from Clemson University and his Juris Doctor from the Tulane University Law School.

Career 

Dietz previously worked at General Dynamics Land Systems, where he was involved in negotiating and managing federal government contracts relating to military system design and development programs. From 2012–2020, he was Associate Counsel in the General Counsel's office at CohnReznick in Roseland, New Jersey, where his practice focused on government and commercial contracts and regulatory and corporate compliance. He also served as Lead Counsel for the firm's Government and Public Sector Group and for data security and privacy matters.

Federal judicial service 

On June 15, 2020, President Trump announced his intent to nominate Dietz to serve as a judge of the United States Court of Federal Claims. On July 2, 2020, his nomination was sent to the Senate. President Trump nominated Dietz to the seat vacated by Judge Victor J. Wolski, who assumed senior status on July 13, 2018. On September 9, 2020, a hearing on his nomination was held before the Senate Judiciary Committee. On October 22, 2020, the Judiciary Committee reported his nomination by a 12–0 vote. On December 19, 2020, the United States Senate invoked cloture on his nomination by a 50–37 vote. His nomination was confirmed later that day by a 51–36 vote. He received his judicial commission on December 22, 2020.

References

External links 
 

1979 births
Living people
21st-century American lawyers
21st-century American judges
Clemson University alumni
Judges of the United States Court of Federal Claims
Lawyers from New Orleans
Lawyers from Washington, D.C.
Maryland lawyers
New Jersey lawyers
Tulane University Law School alumni
United States Article I federal judges appointed by Donald Trump